Emperor Zhang of Han (56 – 9 April 88), born Liu Da, was an emperor of the Chinese Han dynasty from 75 to 88. He was the third emperor of the Eastern Han.

Emperor Zhang was a hardworking and diligent emperor. He reduced taxes and paid close attention to all affairs of state. Zhang also reduced government spending as well as promoted Confucianism. As a result, Han society prospered and its culture flourished during this period. Along with his father Emperor Ming, Emperor Zhang's reign has been highly praised and was regarded as the golden age of the Eastern Han period, and their reigns are collectively known as the Rule of Ming and Zhang.

During his reign, Chinese troops under the leadership of General Ban Chao progressed far west while in pursuit of Xiongnu insurgents harassing the trade routes now collectively known as the Silk Road.

The Eastern Han dynasty, after Emperor Zhang, would be plagued with internal strife between royal factions and eunuchs struggling for power.  The people for the coming century and a half would yearn for the good days of Emperors Ming and Zhang.  (However, part of the strife came from the power obtained by consort clans – and the precedent was set by Emperor Zhang's bestowing of power on both his adoptive mother Empress Dowager Ma's clan and his wife Empress Dou's clan.)

Family background 
Then-Prince Da was born to then-Crown Prince Liu Zhuang and one of his consorts, Consort Jia, in 56.  As Crown Prince Zhang's favorite, Consort Ma – Consort Jia's aunt (her mother's sister) – had no sons, at Crown Prince Zhang's instruction, Consort Ma adopted Prince Da as her own son.  Prince Da therefore grew up considering Consort Ma as his mother, and while he clearly knew that Consort Jia was his birth mother, he never treated her as mother.

In 57, Prince Da's grandfather Emperor Guangwu died, and his father Crown Prince Zhuang succeeded to the throne as Emperor Ming.  In 60, at the behest of his mother Empress Dowager Yin Lihua, Emperor Ming created Consort Ma empress, and Prince Da, as her son, was created crown prince, even though he had four brothers older than he was.

As crown prince 
Not much was recorded about Crown Prince Da's career as crown prince, other than he was taught of the Confucian classics at a young age and was encouraged in his studies by his adoptive mother, Empress Ma, with whom he had a close relation.  He was also close to his uncles of the Ma clan.

In 75, Emperor Ming died, and Crown Prince Da succeeded to the throne as Emperor Zhang at the age of 18.  Empress Ma received the title of empress dowager.

Early reign 
Emperor Zhang continued his father's hardworking tendencies as emperor, but he was more lenient than his strict father.  He sought out honest officials and promoted them, and he himself lived thriftily.  He was generally humble and honored the senior officials who had served his grandfather and father faithfully in accordance.

In 76, at the suggestion of his advisor Yang Zhong and prime minister Diwu Lun, Emperor Zhang ordered that his father's Xiyu (modern Xinjiang and former Soviet central Asia) campaigns be abandoned.  However, one of the Han generals in Xiyu, Ban Chao, seeing the importance of maintaining Han presence in Xiyu, refused to withdraw, and Emperor Zhang eventually relented and put Ban in charge of Han's operations in Xiyu.

Being close to his Ma uncles, Emperor Zhang wanted to create them marquesses from the early start of his reign.  This was initially rebuffed by Empress Dowager Ma, who found this inappropriate.  In 79, however, he created them marquesses over her objection and over their requests to only be made acting marquesses.

In 77, Emperor Zhang took a daughter of his cousin, the Princess Piyang, and great-granddaughter of the statesman Dou Rong, as consort.  He greatly loved her, and in 78, he created Consort Dou empress.

In 79, Empress Dowager Ma, who had given him much good counsel, died.  Even after her death, Emperor Zhang did not honor his birth mother Consort Jia as his mother, but merely permitted her to take on the style of an imperial prince.

Palatial intrigue 
After his mother's death, Emperor Zhang continued to be a diligent emperor, but within the palace, there was much struggle between Empress Dou and the other imperial consorts, which would create political instability down the road.

While Empress Dowager Ma was alive, she selected two daughters of Song Yang as consorts for Emperor Zhang.  In 78, the elder Consort Song gave birth to a son named Liu Qing, and because Empress Dou was sonless, Prince Qing was created crown prince in 79.  The Consorts Song were greatly favored by Empress Dowager Ma.

Later in 79, however, Empress Dou would (perhaps remembering Empress Dowager Ma's example) adopt the son of another imperial consort, Consort Liang, Liu Zhao, as her own son, and she plotted, along with her mother Princess Piyang and her brothers, to have her adopted son made crown prince.  After Empress Dowager Ma's death, she put her plan into action.  She had her brothers collect dossiers on faults of the Song clan while bribing the servants and eunuchs of Consorts Song to gather their own faults.

In 82, an opportunity came for Empress Dou.  The elder Consort Song had become ill, and in her illness, she craved raw cuscuta, and she requested that her family bring them.  Empress Dou seized the cuscuta and falsely accused Consort Song of using it for witchcraft.  Emperor Zhang was enraged and expelled Crown Prince Qing from the palace.  He had the Consorts Song arrested and interrogated by the eunuch Cai Lun.  The Consorts Song saw that they were in deep straits, and they committed suicide by poison.  Crown Prince Qing was deposed and created the Prince of Qinghe instead; he was replaced by Prince Zhao as crown prince.  Prince Zhao, however, was friendly to his brother, and they often spent time together.

The Song sisters would not be Empress Dou's only victims.  After Prince Zhao was made crown prince, his birth mother's clan, the Liangs, did not dare to openly celebrate, but were secretly happy.  When the Dou clan heard of this, they were displeased and fearful, and they felt that they had to destroy the Liangs.  Empress Dou began to give false reports about Prince Zhao's birth mother, Consort Liang, and her sister, also an imperial consort, and they lost Emperor Zhang's favor.  In 83, the Dous further submitted false anonymous accusations against the Consorts Liang's father Liang Song, causing him to die in prison.  The Consorts Liang died of sadness and fear.

The Dous, having made these powerplay, would eventually gain their goals of becoming even more powerful than they were.  Also in 83, Emperor Zhang, having seen that his Ma cousins were not following the law, stopped favoring his Ma uncles, and eventually sent them back to their marches.  Empress Dou's brothers Dou Xian and Dou Du effectively took over in the power structure – the first time in Han history that the empress' clan, rather than the empress dowager's clan, was the most powerful consort clan.  This trend held sway for the rest of Eastern Han Dynasty and would prove to be a source of corruption.

Late reign 
However, Emperor Zhang himself remained fairly diligent and open-minded.  For example, in 84, when two university students, Kong Xi and Cui Yin were accused of improperly criticizing his ancestor Emperor Wu and, by criticizing Emperor Wu, making veiled criticism of Emperor Zhang, Emperor Zhang accepted the letter that Kong submitted in his own defense and made him an official in his administration.

In 86, the first of the Qiang rebellions began, and while the Qiang were pacified fairly quickly, this would be bad omen for the decades to come, as the Qiang, mistreated frequently by Han officials, would constantly rebel throughout the rest of the Eastern Han Dynasty and become a major factor in the decline of the Han Empire.

In 88, Emperor Zhang died at the age of 32 and was succeeded by Crown Prince Zhao, who became Emperor He.

Era names 
 Jianchu 76–84
 Yuanhe 84–87
 Zhanghe 87–88

Family
Consorts and Issue:
 Empress Zhangde, of the Dou clan of Fufeng (d. 97), first cousin once removed
 Empress Gonghuai, of the Liang clan of Anding (61–83)
 Liu Zhao, Emperor Xiaohe (79–106), fourth son
 Empress Jingyin, of the Song clan (58–78)
 Liu Qing, Emperor Xiaode (78–106), third son
 Guiren, of the Shen clan
 Liu Shou, Prince Hui of Jibei (d. 120), fifth son
 Liu Kai, Emperor Xiaomu (d. 131), sixth son
 Unknown
 Liu Kang, Prince Zhen of Qiancheng (d. 93), first son
 Liu Quan, Prince Dao of Pingchun (d. 79), second son
 Liu Shu, Prince Huai of Chengyang (d. 94), seventh son
 Liu Wansui, Prince Shang of Guangzong (d. 90), eighth son
 Princess Wude, personal name Nan, first daughter
 Princess Pingyi, personal name Wang, second daughter
 Married Feng You
 Princess Yin'an, personal name Ji, third daughter

Ancestry

See also
Family tree of the Han Dynasty

References

56 births
88 deaths
Eastern Han dynasty emperors
1st-century Chinese monarchs
Emperors from Luoyang